Hypsibarbus vernayi is a species of cyprinid fish in the genus Hypsibarbus. The specific name references Arthur S. Vernay, an English adventurer who collected the type specimen.

Description
The species can attain a maximum length of 21.6 cm and a maximum weight of 250 g.

Distribution and habitat 
The species is a freshwater fish and occurs in the basins of the Mekong, Chao Phraya and Mae Klong rivers in Thailand and other countries in Southeast Asia.

Behavior
In Thailand, this species will gather to breed and spawn in shallow streams, which are tributaries of the Nan River in the north. This phenomenon occurs only two days in early March of every year. The local people call this "Pla Kong" (lit: "pile fishes"), a natural phenomenon that occurs rarely.

References

Vernayi
Cyprinid fish of Asia
Fish of Thailand
Taxa named by John Roxborough Norman
Fish described in 1925